Attorney General Sullivan may refer to:

Dan Sullivan (U.S. senator) (born 1964), Attorney General of Alaska
Sir Edward Sullivan, 1st Baronet (1822–1885), Attorney General for Ireland
George Sullivan (New Hampshire politician) (1771–1838), Attorney General of New Hampshire
James Sullivan (governor) (1744–1808), Attorney General of Massachusetts
John Sullivan (general) (1740–1795), Attorney General of New Hampshire

See also
General Sullivan (disambiguation)